Sedimentation rate may refer to:
Sedimentation rate of particles in a liquid, described by  Stokes' law
Erythrocyte sedimentation rate, a medical test for inflammation

Rates